Christian 'Chris' McDaniel (born July 19, 1977, in Covington, Kentucky) is an American politician and a Republican member of the Kentucky Senate representing District 23 since January 8, 2013.

He was the running mate of Republican gubernatorial candidate James Comer in the 2015 gubernatorial election.

Education
McDaniel earned his BS from The Citadel, The Military College of South Carolina, and his MBA from Northern Kentucky University. McDaniel graduated from Covington Latin School.

Elections
2020 McDaniel was unopposed in the Republican Primary and defeated Democratic nominee Ryan Olexia with 32,188 votes (57.7%).
2016 McDaniel was unopposed in both the Republican Primary and the General Election.
2012 When District 23 Senator Jack Westwood retired and left the seat open, McDaniel won the May 22, 2012, Republican Primary with 4,036 votes (62.1%), and won the November 6, 2012, General election with 23,993 votes (60.0%) against Democratic nominee James Noll.

References

External links
Official page at the Kentucky General Assembly
Campaign site

Chris McDaniel at Ballotpedia
Chris McDaniel at OpenSecrets

1977 births
Living people
Republican Party Kentucky state senators
Northern Kentucky University alumni
Politicians from Covington, Kentucky
The Citadel, The Military College of South Carolina alumni
United States Army officers
21st-century American politicians